There exist multiple Treaties of Péronne signed in Péronne, France:

Treaty of Péronne (1200)
Treaty of Péronne (1468)
Treaty of Péronne (1641)